Chiliyanaula is a small town near Ranikhet city of Uttarakhand state in India. The town is home to a temple of Haidakhan Baba and Haidakhan Ashram.

History 
The name of the town, Chiliyanaula, is made of two words: Cheli and Naula. Cheli means daughter and Naula means "natural source of water or well" in Kumaoni language.  Earlier, the place was known by the name of "Malla Badhan" (In Kumaoni it means Upper Badhan. Badhan is a village near Chiliyanaula).

Until 1915, Chiliyanaula had just one inn and a small market surrounded by oak trees. Local tax collectors of the British government (known as Thokdar in Kumaoni language) used to stay in that inn during their travel to collect the taxes in neighboring villages. This place had a lot of sources of natural water. In 1920, some local people upgraded those resources with basic constructions of stones and bricks and shaped them into wells. Those people named the constructed wells by the names of their daughters. Hence the place was called Cheli Naula ("Daughter's Wells") – which converted into Chiliyanaula as the time passed. Unfortunately, all the wells are dried now.

Chiliyanaula established as a town in recent years. Before 1980, the town was just a street with few shops. After 1980 when Haidakhan Ashram and G D Birla Memorial School kind of international institute established in this area, it shaped into a town. Today, Chiliyanaula is a Nagar Palika (municipal council) and turning into a city.

References 

Villages in Almora district